Aglossa phaealis is a species of snout moth in the genus Aglossa. It was described by George Hampson in 1906 and is known from Lesotho and Namibia.

References

Moths described in 1906
Pyralini
Insects of Namibia
Insects of Lesotho
Moths of Africa